Post-SSRI sexual dysfunction (PSSD), also known as post-SSRI syndrome, is a disorder in which people who have been administered selective serotonin reuptake inhibitors (SSRIs) or other serotonin reuptake-inhibiting (SRI) drugs experience persistent changes in sexual function for an extended period (at least three to six months, up to years, decades or indefinitely) after ceasing to take the drug. Although the condition is most commonly associated with SRIs, similar or identical syndromes have also been reported after discontinuation of a variety of non-SRI drugs.

First formally acknowledged in the medical literature in 2006, a growing body of evidence has led PSSD to slowly gain recognition by researchers and medical professionals as a distinct clinical pathology from antidepressant discontinuation syndrome and major depressive disorder. The reported symptoms of PSSD commonly include a reduction in the ability to experience sexual desire or arousal, persistent erectile dysfunction in males or loss of vaginal lubrication in females, an enduring inability to orgasm or loss of pleasurable sensation associated with orgasm, and a loss of sensitivity in the genitals or other erogenous zones. Additional non-sexual symptoms are also commonly described, including emotional numbing, anhedonia, depersonalization or derealization, and cognitive impairment. These symptoms are reported in varying combinations and with varying degrees of severity by individuals with PSSD. The disorder is very commonly reported as significantly detrimental to the sufferer's overall quality of life.

There is currently no medical consensus on how to effectively treat PSSD. To date, the mechanism by which SRIs may induce PSSD is unknown, as is the exact mechanism by which SRIs induce sexual dysfunction in many patients actively taking the drug. It is likewise unclear how common the problem is among individuals who have stopped taking SRIs, or what the risk factors are for developing the problem. The symptoms of PSSD are largely shared with post-finasteride syndrome (PFS) and post-retinoid sexual dysfunction/post-Accutane syndrome (PRSD/PAS), two other poorly-understood iatrogenic conditions which have been suggested to share a common etiology with PSSD despite being caused by different types of medication.

Symptoms and diagnosis 
According to diagnostic criteria submitted by David Healy et al. in 2022, a diagnosis of PSSD requires that the subject has previously taken an SSRI or other SRI, and has experienced new (i.e. not present before starting the SRI) symptoms of sexual dysfunction for at least three months after the last dose of the SRI; others have proposed a timeline of at least six months of sexual dysfunction symptoms after cessation of the SRI. Other potential causes of sexual dysfunction should be considered and excluded before a diagnosis is made.

The following symptoms have been reported in association with PSSD:

 Erectile dysfunction
 Loss of vaginal lubrication
 Genital numbness/reduced genital sensitivity (genital anesthesia)
 Inability to achieve orgasm (anorgasmia)
 Reduced pleasure associated with orgasm
 Premature ejaculation
 Reduced sexual desire/libido
 Reduced ability to become sexually aroused
 Decreased penile or testicular size
 Changes in menstrual cycle
 Testicular pain
 Decreased seminal volume and/or quality
 Anhedonia
 Emotional blunting/numbing
 Difficulty thinking or concentrating ("brain fog")
 Issues with memory and recall
 Loss of the ability to weep
 Depersonalization
 Derealization
 Pelvic floor dysfunction
 Interstitial cystitis/painful bladder syndrome, often diagnosed as recurrent urinary tract infections in females or as recurrent prostatitis in males

In many cases, PSSD sufferers report that their symptoms will transiently improve for short periods (usually no more than one or two days) before returning to their previous state. This phenomenon has been referred to as "windows and waves" by PSSD sufferers.

Duration of symptoms 
The length of time during which PSSD symptoms persist appears to vary among patients, with some cases resolving in a matter of months and others persisting for years or even decades; one analysis of patient reports in the Netherlands submitted between 1992 and 2021 listed a case which had reportedly persisted for 23 years.

Prevalence and risk

Medications known to cause PSSD 
Although PSSD is most commonly reported following cessation of SSRIs, cases have also been reported following the use of serotonin-norepinephrine reuptake inhibitors (SNRIs), SRI tricyclic antidepressants, atypical antidepressants such as mirtazapine, SRI antihistamines, tetracycline antibiotics such as doxycycline, analgesics such as tramadol, and antipsychotics such as aripriprazole.

The following medications have been recorded as causing PSSD in some fraction of users:

Selective serotonin reuptake inhibitors (SSRIs) 

 Sertraline (Zoloft)
 Citalopram (Cipramil/Celexa)
 Escitalopram (Lexapro)
 Paroxetine (Paxil/Seroxat)
 Fluvoxamine (Luvox/Faverin)
 Fluoxetine (Prozac/Sarafem)

Serotonin-norepinephrine reuptake inhibitors (SNRIs) 

 Vortioxetine (Trintellix)
 Venlafaxine (Effexor)
 Desvenlafaxine (Pristiq)
 Duloxetine (Cymbalta)
 Atomoxetine (Strattera)
 Levomilnacipran (Fetzima)

Other medications 

 Doxycycline
 Tramadol
 Mirtazapine
 Bupropion
 Aripriprazole

Frequency of PSSD 
Due to a lack of large-scale, well-controlled studies, there are currently no reliable estimates of how many individuals worldwide suffer from PSSD, nor what fraction of SRI users develop PSSD after stopping the drug. The condition is generally assumed to be under-reported, perhaps due to misdiagnosis, lack of recognition by many medical practitioners, or unwillingness of patients to report symptoms due to the prevalent social stigma surrounding sexual dysfunction.

Data released in 2021 under the UK's Freedom of Information Act by the Medicines and Healthcare Products Regulatory Agency showed that in a total of 1654 cases of adverse effects from SSRIs, in 1069 cases the reaction did not continue after the drug was withdrawn, in 225 cases the reaction continued after the drug was withdrawn with the recovery time being unknown, and in 144 cases the reaction continued after the drug was withdrawn and the recovery time was known.

A retrospective review published in The Journal of Urology in 2020 stated that between 2009 and 2019, 4% of the male patients whose charts were assessed in the review (43 patients total) met the criteria for PSSD, having displayed sexual dysfunction symptoms for longer than 6 months after stopping an SSRI.

As of January 2023, there were 2013 members on the PSSD Forum, and over 6,400 members on the PSSD subreddit.

SRI dosage response and other risk factors 
It is unclear whether there is a relationship between the amount of time a person has been taking an SRI and the likelihood of developing PSSD. In one case study published in 2006, persistent sexual dysfunction was evident for seven years after taking an SRI for a period of only five weeks; there have been reports of cases developing after only a few, or even single doses of an SRI.

An online survey of 135 subjects who self-reported as having PSSD found that the majority of respondents were young heterosexual males who had taken relatively high doses of an SSRI or SNRI. Of these, 118 subjects exhibited sexual dysfunction symptoms while taking the drug, while 17 subjects only developed symptoms after stopping the drug.

Adolescence, childhood, and development 
SSRI use before and during sexual maturation is a risk factor for PSSD, and SSRIs have been shown to interfere with normal sexual maturation and development, irreversibly altering sexual behavior and functioning into adulthood. Since fluoxetine is the most-prescribed SSRI for children and adolescents and was the first to be prescribed, more of the studies of long-term effects deal with fluoxetine. SSRIs are documented potent endocrine disruptors, in studies of young non-human animals as well as pediatric clinical trials. They have been show to consistently impair steroidogenesis and causing hypogonadism. Before adulthood, these persistent negative physical effects of SSRI exposure include delayed puberty, overall impaired sexual behavior and functioning, decreased height in males and females, significantly reduced bone mineral density and mass, maldevelopment of the ovaries and uterus in females, and in males, significantly smaller and malformed testes leading to significantly reduced fertility. These detrimental physical and behavioral effects of pubescent and prepubescent SSRI use including infertility and hypogonadism, persist into adulthood, well after cessation of SSRI use, including in male animals treated in late childhood and puberty. This persistent hormonal dysregulation and genital maldevelopment may be relevant to the etiology of PSSD.

There is a demonstrated link between SSRI use before adulthood and significantly lower solitary sexual desire, lower desire for an attractive other, and reduced masturbation frequency. Studies on the long-term effects of adolescent SSRI administration on non-human animals have demonstrated persistent iatrogenic major deficits in sexual functioning, including significantly reduced ejaculation frequency and increased mount latency that remain into adulthood, well after cessation of SSRI treatment. There are reports of sexual dysfunction, often enduring, caused by SSRIs in adolescents, but the incidence and long-term consequences of adolescent SSRI exposure are unknown, possibly due to a lack of baseline sexual experience for comparison.

In May 2006, Eli Lilly agreed to the request from the Committee for Medicinal Products for Human Use to report the effects of fluoxetine on sexual maturation, growth, puberty, hormonal function, and its testicular toxicity in juveniles. The preliminary results showed disruption of puberty and reduced steroidogenesis; however, Lilly never published the final results of the study.

Acknowledgements and warnings issued

In medication leaflets and labels 
The following SSRI medications have been issued with informational leaflets and/or labels containing warnings about post-discontinuation sexual side effects:

 Sertraline (Zoloft)
 Citalopram (Cipramil)
 Paroxetine (Paxil/Seroxat)
 Fluvoxamine (Luvox/Faverin)
 Fluoxetine (Prozac/Sarafem)

In British National Formulary 
The British National Formulary (BNF) is a United Kingdom (UK) pharmaceutical reference book that contains a wide spectrum of information and advice on prescribing and pharmacology, along with specific facts and details about many medicines available through the UK National Health Service (NHS). Sertraline (Zoloft), citalopram (Cipramil), fluoxetine (Prozac/Sarafarm), fluvoxamine (Lubox/Faverin), escitalopram (Lexapro/Cipralex) and paroxetine (Paxil/Seroxat) are listed with the following warning in the BNF:

In Diagnostic and Statistical Manual of Mental Disorders 
In the United States, the DSM-5 serves as the principal authority for psychiatric diagnoses published by American Psychiatric Association. The DSM-5, published in 2013, states that:

In Textbook of Rare Sexual Medicine Conditions 
This textbook is written and edited by international experts in the field of sexual medicine and provides multidisciplinary information for medical practitioners, including biological-psychological-social approaches to disease diagnosis and treatment. The textbook includes an entire chapter dedicated to PSSD:

In Psychiatry and Sexual Medicine: A Comprehensive Guide for Clinical Practitioners 
This textbook contains a section on PSSD on pages 353–371:

By health and medicines agencies 
On the 11th of June 2019 the Pharmacovigilance Risk Assessment Committee of the European Medicines Agency concluded that a possible relationship exists between SSRI use and persistent sexual dysfunction after cessation of use. The committee concluded that a warning should be added to the label of SSRIs and SNRIs regarding this possible risk.

The Hong Kong Department of Health released a warning about PSSD in 2021.

Health Canada issued the following warning in 2021, requiring all medications to include the following warning in their leaflets:

The European Medicines Agency issued a similar warning in 2022:

The NHS published the following statement regarding sertraline (Zoloft) on their website in 2022:

Relation to SSRI sexual side effects in general 
SSRIs are very commonly reported to induce sexual side effects in patients actively taking the drug, most or all of which overlap with the reported symptoms of PSSD. SSRI-associated sexual dysfunction has also been demonstrated in many animal studies. It is unclear whether PSSD is caused by the same mechanism that produces these effects, or whether it is caused by a complication of SSRI use with a different mechanism but similar outward presentation. PSSD has been reported to occur both in people who experience sexual side effects while taking an SSRI and those who do not experience sexual side effects while taking the SSRI.

SSRIs such as fluoxetine, paroxetine, citalopram, escitalopram or dapoxetine and clomipramine are prescribed in some cases to treat premature ejaculation (PE). Many male patients who experience PE have heightened penile sensitivity. When these SSRIs are used for PE, the side effects can include anorgasmia, erectile dysfunction, and diminished libido. The genital numbness/anesthesia does not correlate with depression or anxiety.

Research and potential etiologies 
The mechanism by which SRIs induce PSSD, as well as the reason why the syndrome persists long after stopping SRIs, is unknown. However, a number of studies have resulted in potentially relevant findings that may point to a mechanism for PSSD. A combination of different factors may be responsible for causing PSSD.

Potential role of SSRI-induced epigenetic changes 
SSRIs and other antidepressants are known to induce epigenetic changes by altering DNA and histone methylation states. Epigenetic changes in the brain are known to play a role in memory, learning, depression, addiction and various other cognitive phenomena. DNA methylation patterns and histone methylation-dependent changes to chromatin structure in neurons can remain stable for long periods of time.

A literature review published in 2017 states that:

The 5-HT1A receptor is involved with a variety of neurological functions, among them modulation of sexual arousal and erectile function. Mutations within the MECP2 gene have been implicated in systemic lupus erythematosus (SLE), a neurological autoimmune disorder that in some cases may be caused by drugs such as SSRIs, and which is sometimes associated with autonomic dysfunction and/or sexual dysfunction.

A study published in 2018 found that treatment with citalopram induced significant changes to DNA methylation at 626 gene promoters throughout the genome of human embryonic kidney (HEK293) cells, with 354 promoters being hypermethylated and 272 being hypomethylated; 24 of the affected genes are involved in neurotransmission. Among the signaling pathways most affected by citalopram was the L-dopa pathway, with at least 31 affected genes identified whose products are regulated in some way by L-dopa.

In 2022, a study in rats found that treatment with fluoxetine resulted in "profound" changes in both gene expression and chromatin structure in cells across multiple regions of the brain; over 4000 differentially-regulated genes were identified in the study.

Potential role of endocrine disruption by SSRIs 
A study published in 2017 reported that treating cultured H295R (human adrenocortical carcinoma) cells with the six most commonly used SSRIs (fluoxetine, paroxetine, escitalopram, citalopram, sertraline, and fluvoxamine) resulted in disruption of steroid synthesis; all six drugs were observed to decrease androgen production and produce a compensatory increase in estrogen production, with stimulation of CYP19 aromatase apparently being a common factor. A 2021 review of published data from studies of endocrine disruption by SSRIs concluded that most SSRIs have demonstrated the potential to affect testosterone and estrogen levels in patients.

Both SSRIs and other medications that induce similar post-withdrawal sexual dysfunction syndromes have been found to affect the expression of allopregnanolone, a neurosteroid. In 2022, a study of the effects of finasteride in rats found that the drug reduced levels of allopregnanolone for at least one month after withdrawal, with a concurrent increase in pregnanolone also being observed; finasteride is a non-SRI medication reported to occasionally induce post-finasteride syndrome (PFS), an iatrogenic condition which presents very similarly to PSSD. However, whereas finasteride is a 5-α reductase inhibitor and thus inhibits the conversion of progesterone to allopregnanolone, SSRIs do not appear to share this activity; at least one study has shown fluoxetine to have no effect on 5-α reductase activity in rat brains. In further contrast to finasteride, SSRIs have been shown to actually increase allopregnanolone levels during treatment in a manner independent from their primary mechanism of action, gaining them the label of "selective brain steroidogenic stimulants" (SBSS). However, at least one study in rats has indicated that withdrawal from paroxetine may reduce the expression of enzymes involved in the production of neuroactive steroids, including allopregnanolone.

Potential role of persistent SSRI-induced electrophysiological changes 
A study published in 2020 found that exposing planarians (flatworms) to fluoxetine over a three-day period resulted in changes to the resting potential of the flatworms' cells that persisted for at least a week after fluoxetine was removed. The authors speculated that persistent effects of this kind in human neurons could play a role in the long-lasting effects sometimes observed after treatment with SSRIs.

Potential role of ACE2 downregulation by SSRIs 
In December 2022, Luisa Guerrini at the University of Milan reported preliminary findings to RxISK in which her research group had observed that treating human immortalized keratinocyte (HaCaT) cells with sertraline (Zoloft) resulted in persistent dose-dependent downregulation of the proteins p63 and ACE2 for at least 24 hours after treatment. Similar results were observed with isotretinoin (Accutane) and finasteride, two non-SSRI drugs which are reported to cause post-discontinuation syndromes similar to PSSD. The primary role of p63 is to regulate the replication and differentiation of epidermal skin cells, whereas ACE2 in its soluble (non-membrane-bound) form (sACE2) acts to convert the vasoconstriction-inducing hormone angiotensin II to angiotensin (1-7).

Angiotensin (1–7) is a vasodilator with antioxidant and anti-inflammatory properties; among other functions, it stimulates the increased activity of neuronal and endothelial nitric oxide synthase (NOS) enzymes, thereby increasing production of nitric oxide (NO). Neuronal nitric oxide synthase (nNOS) is widely expressed in the central nervous system (CNS), and reduced expression of nNOS has been implicated in the pathologies of major depressive disorder (MDD), anxiety, memory loss, and bipolar disorder (BPD). Multiple studies have indicated that nNOS interacts with the serotonin transporter (SERT), the primary target of most SSRIs, in ways that may affect serotonin uptake and signaling. NO itself is a neurotransmitter with a variety of functions in the CNS, and is notably a major contributor to erectile function in males, with impaired production and action of NO being commonly implicated in erectile dysfunction. At least one study in mice has demonstrated that activation of ACE2 by the anti-protozoan compound diminazene aceturate (DIZE) results in upregulation of endothelial NOS (eNOS) and NO signaling within mammalian penile tissues. NO is also known to act as a modulator of epigenetic regulation in some cells.

ACE2, angiotensin (1-7), and the MAS receptor pathway of the renin–angiotensin system (RAS) have all been implicated in the pathology of anxiety and depressive disorders, and have been identified as potential therapeutic targets for treatment of anxiety and depression. A study published in 2021 indicated that genetic variation within the ACE2 gene may determine the degree to which depressed patients respond favorably to treatment with SSRIs; specifically, the intronic ACE2 mutation G8790A was correlated with significantly better response to SSRI treatment.

Notably, the membrane-bound form of ACE2 (mACE2) is also the receptor protein used by SARS-CoV-2 as an entry point into the cell. Binding of the SARS-CoV-2 spike protein to soluble ACE2 (sACE2) has been suggested to stimulate an autoimmune response that accounts for many of the symptoms of severe COVID-19. Binding of the spike protein to ACE2 has also been suggested to produce an inflammatory response that could cause "Long COVID", a post-infection syndrome exhibiting multiple overlapping symptoms with PSSD, post-finasteride syndrome (PFS) and post-Accutane syndrome (PAS), most notably cognitive dysfunction/"brain fog" and sexual dysfunction. A 2021 study with a large patient sample size (83,584 participants) found a significant association between prior SSRI use and reduced mortality from COVID-19. Another study from 2021 found that clomipramine (Anafranil), an SRI tricyclic antidepressant, inhibited infection by SARS-CoV-2 in human iPS-derived cardiomyocytes.

Depletion of ACE2 is thought to lead to dysregulation of bradykinin in COVID-19 patients, specifically resulting in increased Des-Arg(9)-bradykinin (DABK), a bioactive metabolite of bradykinin associated with lung injury and inflammation, in the extracellular environment. Increased activity of DABK is thought to contribute to the inflammatory "cytokine storm" seen in severe COVID-19. Studies in both humans and rats have also suggested that bradykinin may play a significant role in erectile function, with the effect of bradykinin being enhanced by angiotensin (1-7). Bradykinin is known to play a role in both inflammation and nitric oxide signaling.

ACE2 is highly expressed in the epithelium of the intestines, where it plays a role in maintaining innate immunity and homeostasis of gut microbial communities. Both SARS-CoV-2 infection and treatment with SSRIs have been demonstrated to cause changes in gut microbiota populations. Mice deficient in ACE2 have been shown to be significantly more prone to gut dysbiosis, colitis and amino acid malabsorption. Among the amino acids that are poorly absorbed by ACE2-deficient mice is L-tryptophan, a precursor to serotonin; reduced synthesis of serotonin is also observed in these mice, presumably as a consequence of reduced L-tryptophan availability.

A study published in 2021 found that ACE2 expression was abnormally low in patients with Myalgic Encephalitis/Chronic Fatigue Syndrome (ME/CFS), a poorly-understood condition characterized by overwhelming fatigue. Several reported symptoms of ME/CFS overlap with PSSD, including cognitive difficulties and sexual dysfunction.

Potential role of gut microbiome disruption by SSRIs 
Multiple studies have indicated that the composition of an individual's gut microbiome may contribute to sexual dysfunction. As mentioned previously, SSRIs are known to induce changes to the gut microbiome, as is finasteride (Propecia), another non-SRI medication known to cause post-discontinuation sexual dysfunction. SARS-CoV-2 infection is likewise known to alter gut microbe populations, and is associated with a post-infection syndrome known as "Long COVID", the symptoms of which may include sexual dysfunction. Isotretinoin (Accutane), a non-SRI medication which is reported to occasionally induce a post-discontinuation syndrome similar to PSSD and PFS, has not been observed to induce significant changes in gut microbiota in animal models.

Potential SSRI-induced autoimmune response 
In December 2022, a RxISK blog post noted the occurrence of many self-reports in which individuals with PSSD had tested as having elevated levels of auto-antibodies against muscarinic, catecholamine and ACE receptor proteins. The majority of these tests were conducted by CellTrend, a German contract research organization which offers blood test panels for several auto-antibodies thought to be involved in ME/CFS, long COVID, SFN and postural orthostatic tachycardia syndrome (POTS). As of 2022, this pattern of test results has not been independently corroborated by other laboratories.

Although the role of autoimmunity in PSSD has not been confirmed, precedents exist for drug-induced autoimmune disorders, as well as for autoimmune disorders that affect nervous system function. Notably, the early SSRI Zimelidine was withdrawn from the market after studies found its usage to be associated with an approximately 25-fold increased risk of developing Guillain–Barré syndrome. Another notable example of a drug-induced autoimmune disorder is drug-induced lupus erythematosus (DILE), which can be caused by a variety of medications including ACE inhibitors (and according to at least one case report, citalopram), and which is thought to be caused at least in part by drug-induced demethylation within the genomes of CD4+ T cells.

Studies have indicated that several autoimmune disorders, including Sjögren syndrome, Addison's disease and multiple sclerosis, may be associated with a higher than average incidence of sexual dysfunction. Autonomic neuropathy, a condition in which nerves involved in controlling automatic bodily functions become damaged, is known to occur in lupus erythematosus and Guillain-Barré syndrome, and is associated with sexual dysfunction.

Anti-NMDAR encephalitis, in which antibodies are generated by the immune system against the N-methyl-D-aspartate receptor (NMDAR), is among the most common forms of autoimmune encephalitis (though rare in absolute terms, affecting 1 in 1.5 million people per year), and is associated with a wide array of highly variable symptoms. At least one case of Anti-NMDAR encephalitis has been recorded in which the patient experienced no symptoms other than memory loss, a common non-sexual symptom of PSSD. The NMDA receptor has been found to play a key role in ejaculation during male orgasm.

Gut dysbiosis is known to be a causative or contributing factor in some autoimmune disorders, and is a known cause of autoimmune neurological disorders such as Guillain-Barré syndrome. As discussed previously, SSRIs are known to affect the gut microbiota of treated individuals.

Treatment 
There is as yet no established treatment for PSSD. In an unknown fraction of cases, symptoms are reported to resolve spontaneously with time, but the duration of symptoms appears to vary widely among patients. Many anecdotal self-reports exist in which various approaches, ranging from pharmacological or psychiatric treatments to dietary or lifestyle changes, allegedly correlate with improvement in PSSD symptoms, but these results have not been independently verified or replicated.

Several studies have been conducted which attempt to identify viable treatment options for PSSD, but in general these have suffered from a small sample size and lack of controls, limiting their informative utility. One study from 2022 suggests that vortioxetine (Trintellix) may be able to treat PSSD symptoms, though the strength of this evidence is relatively weak due to the aforementioned caveats. However, vortioxetine is also recorded as causing sexual dysfunction and/or PSSD in some cases, as is buproprion (Wellbutrin), another drug commonly prescribed as a treatment for SSRI-induced sexual dysfunction, either while taking SSRIs or after cessation of SSRI treatment.

A study from 2019 reported success in treating a single patient's PSSD symptoms using a dietary supplement called EDOVIS, containing L-citrulline, Tribulus terrestris, Peruvian maca, muira puama, and folic acid. However, as with the other described study from 2022, the small sample size and lack of controls limit the strength of this study's conclusions.

In some cases, reinstatement of an SSRI is reported to relieve PSSD symptoms, but in other cases this strategy has been reported to either be ineffective or lead to worsening of symptoms. The medications buspirone and bupropion (Wellbutrin) are commonly prescribed to treat SSRI-associated sexual dysfunction, either while the patient is still taking SSRIs or in cases of post-discontinuation dysfunction, but likewise these medications are reported as having variable effects (positive, negative or ineffective) on PSSD patients' symptoms.

Societal impact and support communities 
Since 2006, a number of news articles have been published by various outlets on the subject of PSSD.

Multiple online support groups and networks have formed to share information among individuals affected by PSSD and/or increase public awareness of the condition. These include the PSSD Network, PSSD Forum, PSSD International, Canadian PSSD Society, and the Post SSRI Sexual Dysfunction subreddit (r/pssd on Reddit). The advocacy group RxISK is also dedicated to sharing information about PSSD and other iatrogenic disorders. The website StuffThatWorks is currently collecting information from volunteers in an effort to find broadly applicable treatment strategies for PSSD and other chronic conditions.

On 21 June 2022, RxISK began a research fund to support and stimulate interest in PSSD research; the group has also offered a prize of $100,000 USD to anyone who can identify a reliable cure for persistent sexual side effects after stopping antidepressants, finasteride (Propecia), or isotretinoin (Accutane).

Several medical practitioners, including David Healy, Josef Witt-Doerring, and Sanil Rege, have released YouTube videos in which they discuss PSSD.

Similar or relevant conditions 
PSSD is one of several known iatrogenic syndromes characterized by persistent sexual dysfunction after stopping a medication; others include:

 Post-Finasteride Syndrome (PFS), a condition affecting some individuals treated with the hair-loss drug finasteride (Propecia)
 Post-Retinoid Sexual Dysfunction (PRSD) or Post-Accutane Syndrome (PAS), a condition affecting some individuals treated with the acne medication isotretinoin (Accutane)
 Persistent Genital Arousal Disorder (PGAD) or priapism have also been reported to occasionally occur following cessation of SSRI or SNRI use
 Hard Flaccid Syndrome (HFS) has been reported to occur following the use of bremelanotide
In 2014, a review of 120 reports submitted to RxISK from more than 20 countries concluded that PSSD, PFS and PRSD/PAS exhibit extensively overlapping symptom profiles. As described above, Long COVID shares some symptoms with PSSD, PFS and PRSD/PAS, among them cognitive dysfunction/"brain fog" and sexual dysfunction.

Several studies in both humans and animals have suggested that use of SSRIs at an early age may increase the likelihood of asexuality during later development. A 2020 study in which 610 young adult individuals were surveyed found that childhood SSRI use among female participants was strongly correlated with reduced sexual desire and activity; childhood SSRI use among male participants was correlated with reduced frequency of partnered sexual activity as an adult. Animal studies have found that exposure to an SSRI during pregnancy or at an early age produces sexual deficits in adulthood.

The drug 3,4-methylenedioxymethamphetamine (MDMA), which acts to stimulate the release and inhibit the reuptake of serotonin, can in some cases produce adverse effects that persist long after the drug has been withdrawn, including neurocognitive impairments such as mood disorders and sexual dysfunction. The mechanism behind MDMA neurotoxicity is not fully understood, but a similar mechanism has been suggested to potentially play a role in PSSD.

Chemotherapy-induced peripheral neuropathy is a condition in which pain and sensory abnormalities can persist for months or years after chemotherapy treatment. Some patients may experience “coasting,” where symptoms intensify after completion of treatment. As such, patients can be cancer-free and still suffer from disabling neuropathy induced by cancer treatment.

Charcot–Wilbrand syndrome is a neurological condition characterized by the loss of the ability to mentally visualize or to experience dreams while asleep; these symptoms are also commonly reported amongst PSSD sufferers.

Literature 
The following table contains a list of textbooks, literature reviews, freedom of information request and research articles discussing PSSD:

See also

References

External links 

 PSSD subreddit 
 PSSD forum 

Sexual disorders
Clinical pharmacology
Medication side effects
Drug-induced diseases
Ailments of unknown cause
Syndromes
Syndromes affecting female reproductive system